Priority is the sixth studio album by the Pointer Sisters, released in 1979 on the Planet label.

History
Their second venture with producer Richard Perry, it was also their second venture into rock.  The album peaked at number 72 on the Billboard 200 and reached number 44 on the R&B albums chart.  Two singles were released, "Blind Faith" and "Who Do You Love".  Both songs failed to reach the Billboard Hot 100.  The album was remastered and issued on CD with a bonus track, "Nothin' But a Heartache", in 2009 by Wounded Bird Records.

Track listing

Personnel 

The Pointer Sisters
 Anita Pointer – lead vocals (3, 7), backing vocals
 Ruth Pointer – lead vocals (2, 6, 8), backing vocals
 June Pointer – lead vocals (1, 4, 5, 9), backing vocals

Musicians
 Bill Payne – acoustic piano (1–4, 8, 9)
 Nicky Hopkins – acoustic piano (5, 6)
 William D. "Smitty" Smith – organ (1–4, 7, 8, 9), electric piano (7)
 Waddy Wachtel – lead guitar (1, 2, 4, 5, 8), guitar (1–4, 7–9), acoustic guitar (4), rhythm guitar (5, 6), slide guitar (7, 9)
 Dan Dugmore – guitar (1, 2, 7–9), pedal steel guitar (3), lead guitar (6), EBow (6)
 David Spinozza – guitar (4), slide guitar (5)
 Scott Chambers – bass (1–9)
 Rick Marotta – drums (1–9)
 Bobby Guidotti – tambourine (5), percussion (7, 9)

Production 
 Richard Perry – producer
 Dennis Kirk – recording engineer
 Gabe Veltri – assistant engineer
 Bill Schnee – remix engineer
 Doug Sax and Mike Reese – mastering at The Mastering Lab (Los Angeles, CA).
 Kathleen Nelson – production coordinator
 Michael Solomon – production coordinator
 Michael Barackman – song coordinator
 Kosh – art direction and design
 Mark Hanauer – photography

Chart positions

References

External links
 

1979 albums
The Pointer Sisters albums
Albums produced by Richard Perry
Planet Records albums